Petr Sepéši (23 April 1960, Brezno, Slovakia – 29 July 1985, Františkovy Lázně) was a Czech singer. From 1962 to his death, he lived alternately in Aš until his death in 1985. He graduated from the mechanics of textile machines and then worked in NC Tosta Aš. At that time, he began to be interested in music and formed a band named Apendix. From 1983 to his death, he was in a relationship with Iveta Bartošová, with whom he founded a singing couple, and with whom he collaborated with extensively. He died in a car crash, along with two other people, at a railroad crossing in Františkovy Lázně, on the evening of July 29, 1985, in which he was heading from Prague home to visit his mother in his hometown of Aš. He was buried in the municipal cemetery in Aš. Bartošová survived him by almost 29 years.

References

External links
 Sepéši in the Czech Library national database
 Discogs.com
 Fan site of Iveta Bartošová

1960 births
1985 deaths
People from Brezno
Czechoslovak male singers
Road incident deaths in Czechoslovakia
Railway accident deaths in the Czech Republic